GadgetTrak is a company based in Portland, Oregon, that develops theft recovery and data protection software under the same name. The company was founded in February 2007 by Ken Westin with the launch of the first theft recovery product for USB mass storage devices, tracking stolen devices including iPods, flash drives, digital cameras and other devices when connected to a computer.  The company was issued a patent for the technology on February 24, 2009. GadgetTrak's technology was featured during a special segment by Dateline on iPod theft where they tracked stolen iPods and confronted the thieves. A customized version of the technology was embedded in FLIR thermal imaging cameras as part of an exclusive licensing agreement under the name ThermaTrak utilized for both theft recovery as well as export controls.

Patents 
The company has been issued two patents for its groundbreaking technologies:

Patent No. 9,083,624 applies to the process of tracking lost or stolen computing devices by the use of Wi-Fi and/or GPS and/or cellular triangulation.

Patent No. 7,496,201 applies to the process of tracking and recovering devices such as iPods, flash drives, and digital cameras.

Mobile software 
Windows and Blackberry  In October 2008, the company launched its GadgetTrak Mobile Security app for Blackberry and Windows mobile devices.

Apple iPhones  On November 4, 2008, the company launched its first mobile security software app for the Apple iPhone  a year and a half before Apple launched Find My iPhone.

Android devices  At CES 2012, the company launched a version of GadgetTrak Mobile Security for  Android devices.  Along with the Android release, other upgrades were added, including a web-based control panel to activate tracking, remotely wipe data from the device, encrypt and backup data as well as an enterprise group management console. 

Just after launch, the application was put to test by a chain of Sprint stores that installed the software on their demo units. One store in Tigard, Oregon had several devices stolen. With the help of the GadgetTrak Mobile Security app, they were able to recover the devices and apprehend the thieves.

Laptop Software 
Mac Laptops  On November 12, 2008, the company launched the Mac laptop version of its software that utilizes the web camera to capture a photo of a thief, as well as the utilization of Wi-Fi positioning to provide location within 10–20 meters. Shortly after the product launch, there were a number of stolen laptop recoveries using the software, the first being in Brooklyn, New York where a stolen iMac was tracked to a tattoo parlor where police recovered the stolen computer along with other stolen property.

Windows Laptops  In April 2009, the company launched a Windows version of their laptop software further expanding their product offering.

Highlighted recoveries 
GadgetTrak claims many "firsts" with regards to devices that have been recovered and methods used.

 June 2007 (Newmarket, ON) First known recovery of a stolen iPod ever using tracking technology  followed by others
 February 2008 (Dallas, TX) First known recovery of a stolen USB flash drive using tracking technology
 November 2008 (Anchorage, AK) First known recovery of a stolen cell phone using tracking technology
 June 2009 (Edmund, OK) First recovery of a stolen phone recovered even after SIM card removed
 August 2009 (Brooklyn, NY) First recovery of a stolen computer utilizing Wi-Fi positioning and web camera hardware
 September 2009 (Oakland, CA) A business was broken into and multiple laptops stolen, one had GadgetTrak installed that led police to a house where multiple stolen laptops were discovered as well as methamphetamine
 November 2009 (Portland, OR  Missouri) GadgetTrak tracked a stolen laptop from Portland, OR to Missouri unveiling an organized theft ring that was fencing stolen property between the two states to avoid detection
 January 2010 (Springfield, OR) GadgetTrak software leads police to burglary suspect recovering a stolen laptop and family jewelry
 February 2010 (Portland, OR) After a series of repeated break-ins and computer thefts in Portland area schools, one school district install GadgetTrak on several "bait" devices, within a week the school was robbed again luckily including the laptops that had the software on them. GadgetTrak and police tracked a stolen laptop to Vancouver, WA and ended up arresting 6 people involved in the theft ring.
 January 2011 (Moraga, CA) Laptop stolen from a St. Mary's College student recovered by police after several weeks of tracking reports from GadgetTrak
 February 2011 (Portland, OR) A laptop stolen from a home during New Year's Eve was recovered after photos, location data provided police with the general area and IP address confirmed exact address and identity of person in possession of the stolen laptop

References

Companies based in Portland, Oregon
Computer security software companies
Security software